Makis Papaioannou (born May 8, 1977), is a Cypriot former professional footballer who played as a centre back. He is the current professional technical director for Cypriot First Division club Nea Salamina.

Career
Papaioannou played for AEK Larnaca F.C. during the 2003–04 Cypriot First Division season. That season he also helped them win the Cypriot Cup and Papaioannou scored both goals in the final as they defeated AEL Limassol 2–1.

Honours
AEK Larnaca
 Cypriot Cup: 2003–04

References

External links
 

1977 births
Living people
Association football midfielders
Cypriot footballers
Othellos Athienou F.C. players
AEK Larnaca FC players
AC Omonia players
Olympiakos Nicosia players
Ermis Aradippou FC players
Cypriot First Division players